Arthur Mackley (3 July 1865 – 21 December 1926) was an English actor and director of the silent era. He appeared in more than 150 films between 1910 and 1925. He frequently took the part of a sheriff in Westerns, earning the nickname "Sheriff" Mackley.  He also directed 64 films between 1911 and 1915, at least 26 for Reliance-Mutual release.
 
He was born in Portsmouth, Hampshire, England and died in Los Angeles, California.

Selected filmography
 Alkali Ike's Auto (1911)
 Across the Plains (1911)
 The Honor System (1917)
 The Crow (1919)
 The Feud (1919)
 The Sheriff's Oath (1920)
 Devil Dog Dawson (1921)
 Shootin' for Love (1923)
 The Hurricane Kid (1925)

References

External links

1865 births
1926 deaths
English male silent film actors
English film directors
20th-century English male actors
Male actors from Portsmouth
British emigrants to the United States
Mass media people from Portsmouth